The following highways are numbered 357:

Canada
Manitoba Provincial Road 357
 Nova Scotia Route 357
Prince Edward Island Route 357
Saskatchewan Highway 357

Japan
 Japan National Route 357

United States
  Arkansas Highway 357
  Georgia State Route 357 (former)
  Indiana State Road 357
  Maryland Route 357 (former)
  New York State Route 357
 New York State Route 357 (former)
  Ohio State Route 357
  Puerto Rico Highway 357
  South Carolina Highway 357
  Tennessee State Route 357
  Texas State Highway 357
  Virginia State Route 357
 Virginia State Route 357 (former)